= Conglomerates Collide =

1981 simulation video game

- Publisher: RockRoy
- Platform: Apple II
- Release: 1981
- Genre: Simulation

Conglomerates Collide is a simulation video game published in 1981 by RockRoy for the Apple II.

== Gameplay ==
In Conglomerates Collide, the player is a company president who grows the company by purchasing other companies.

== Reception ==
Bob Proctor reviewed the game for Computer Gaming World, and stated that "Conglomerates Collide is only moderately interesting. It does have flashy graphics but these are not important to the play of the game."
